Mirapinna esau, the hairyfish, is a species of flabby whalefish only known from the Atlantic Ocean near the Azores.  Formerly considered a member of the no-longer-recognized family Mirapinnidae, this species is the only known member of its genus.

Description

Mirapinna esau grows to a length of  total length (TL). Little is known of the fish beyond its appearance. Wheeler (1977) states that only one specimen was caught, near the sea surface, and that it was a copepod feeder. The original specimen was captured north of the Azores at 47°20'North, 22°30'West.

Etymology 

The generic name is from the Latin mirus (wonderful) and pinna (thorn), for the unusual fins possessed by this fish.
The specific name is from the Biblical figure Esau, who is stated to be a hairy man (Genesis 27:11).

References

Cetomimidae
Monotypic fish genera
Fish described in 1956